Raúl López was a Mexican wrestler. He competed in the men's freestyle welterweight at the 1932 Summer Olympics.

References

External links
 

Year of birth missing
Year of death missing
Mexican male sport wrestlers
Olympic wrestlers of Mexico
Wrestlers at the 1932 Summer Olympics
Place of birth missing